In aviation, a class rating is an allowance to fly a certain group of aircraft that require training common to all aircraft within the group. A type rating is specified if a particular aircraft requires additional specialized training beyond the scope of initial license and aircraft class training. Which aircraft require a type rating is decided by the local aviation authority. Almost all single engine piston (SEP) or multi engine piston (MEP) single pilot aircraft can be flown without a type rating, but are covered by a class rating instead. In the United States, all turbojets require a type rating. Aircraft with a maximum take-off weight of more than  typically require a type rating.

There are seven categories of aircraft, which contain the following classes:

Gallery

Notes

References 
 JAA official website - list of class and type ratings
 Electronic Code of Federal Regulations, Title 14: Aeronautics and Space; PART 61—CERTIFICATION: PILOTS, FLIGHT INSTRUCTORS, AND GROUND INSTRUCTORS

Flight training
Aviation licenses and certifications